Kollaparru is a village in West Godavari district in the state of Andhra Pradesh in India. Cherukuvada railway Station and  Akividu railway Station are the nearest train stations.

Demographics
 India census, Kollaparru has a population of 2894 of which 1479 are males while 1415 are females. The average sex ratio of Kollaparru village is 957. The child population is 276, which makes up 9.54% of the total population of the village, with sex ratio 816 which is significantly lower than state average. In 2011, the literacy rate of Kollaparru village was 69.52% when compared to 67.02% of Andhra Pradesh.

See also 
 West Godavari district

References 

Villages in West Godavari district